Air Groove (in Japanese: エアグルーヴ, foaled April 6th, 1993 ~ April 23rd, 2013) is a Japanese racehorse and the winner of the 1996 Yushun Himba.

Career

Air Groove's first race was on October 29, 1995, at the Icho Stakes, where she came in first. 

She came in 2nd place at the Grade-1 1995  Hopeful Stakes. She started off the 1996 season with a win at the 1996 Tulip Sho in March.  She then won the first of his multiple Grade-1 wins by winning the 1996 Yushun Himba.

Her next victory came almost a year later, when she captured the July 1997 Grade-3  Mermaid Stakes. This win sparked a three race win streak that saw her win the 1996 Sapporo Kinen and the 1996 Grade-1 Tenno Sho.  She capped off the year with a 2nd place finish at the 1997 Japan Cup and the 3rd place Arima Kinen. 

Her 1998 season was also very successful, as she either won or placed on the podium at 6 of her 7 races.  She started off the year with a win at the April Ōsaka Hai, and came in 2nd at the June 1998 Naruo Kinen. She came in 3rd at the July 1998 Takarazuka Kinen and got the last win of her career at the August 1998 Sapporo Kinen. Her final race of his career was on December 27, 1998, when she came in 5th at the Arima Kinen.

Stud career
Air Groove's descendants include:

c = colt, f = filly

Pedigree

References

1993 racehorse births
Racehorses bred in Japan
Racehorses trained in Japan
Thoroughbred family 8-f